Saly Ou Moeut (born 7 February 1992) is a Cambodian male jet skier. He represented Cambodia at the 2018 Asian Games, which was also his first Asian Games event.

During the 2018 Asian Games, he became the first Cambodian male athlete to win an Asian Games gold medal and also became only the third overall Cambodian to win gold for Cambodia at the Asian Games history after striking gold in the men's ski modified event on 25 August. This was also the second gold medal for Cambodia during the 2018 Asiad following Jessa Khan who claimed gold in ju-jitsu on 24 August. Saly Ou Moeut also went onto claim a bronze in the men's runabout 1100 stock event, which eventually became the first bronze medal for Cambodia at the 2018 Asian Games.

References 

1992 births
Living people
Cambodian jet skiers
Jet skiers at the 2018 Asian Games
Medalists at the 2018 Asian Games
Asian Games gold medalists for Cambodia
Asian Games bronze medalists for Cambodia
Asian Games medalists in jet skiing
Sportspeople from Phnom Penh